Fagner Ribeiro da Costa also known as Fagner Bahia (born August 24, 1990) is a Brazilian football player.

Career
Fagner Bahia began his club career with PSTC. He has played as a striker for Brazilian sides ASA and Atlético Paranaense, and in Japan with Montedio Yamagata and Albirex Niigata, before returning to PSTC in 2013. Fagner Bahia signed for J. Malucelli Futebol in 2014.

Club statistics

References

External links

j-league

1990 births
Living people
Brazilian footballers
Brazilian expatriate footballers
Expatriate footballers in Japan
J1 League players
Club Athletico Paranaense players
Montedio Yamagata players
Albirex Niigata players
Association football forwards